is a railway station in Kirishima, Kagoshima, Japan.

Lines

Layout 
The station consists of a side and an island platform serving three tracks at grade. Two sidings branch off track 3 with one ending in a vehicle shed. The station building, located on the east side of the tracks, is a modern concrete structure that houses a waiting area, an automatic ticket vending machine and staffed ticket window. Bike sheds and parking are available at the station forecourt. Access to the island platform is by means of a footbridge. Separate from this, another bridge, served by elevators and known as the Kokubu Station East-West Free Passage allows pedestrians to access the streets on both sides of the tracks. Parking is also available at the station forecourt on the west side of tracks.

Management of the passenger facilities at the station has been outsourced to the JR Kyushu Tetsudou Eigyou Co., a wholly owned subsidiary of JR Kyushu specialising in station services. It staffs the ticket booth which is equipped with a Midori no Madoguchi facility.

Platforms

JR

Adjacent stations

History
The station was opened on 24 November 1929 by Japanese Government Railways (JGR) as the eastern terminus of the then  which it had laid from Nishi-Kokubu (now ). On 6 December 1932, the entire stretch of track from Kokura through Kokubu to Kagoshima was redesignated as the Nippō Main Line. With the privatization of Japanese National Railways (JNR), the successor of JGR, on 1 April 1987, the station came under the control of JR Kyushu.

Nearby places
Kokubu-Chūō High School
Kirishima City Hall
Kokubu Onsen

See also
List of railway stations in Japan

References

External links
Kokubu (JR Kyushu)

Railway stations in Japan opened in 1929
Railway stations in Kagoshima Prefecture